The discography of the South Korean singer Jung Yong-hwa consists of three studio albums, two live albums, two extended plays, five soundtrack appearances, and multiple singles.

Albums

Studio albums

Live albums

Extended plays

Singles

As lead artist

As featured artist

Soundtrack appearances

See also 
 CNBLUE discography
 List of songs written and produced by Jung Yong-hwa

References 

Discographies of South Korean artists
Discography
K-pop discographies